Live India is an Indian Hindi news and media website focusing on national news and viral content. Its headquarter in Noida, India. Foundation of the news platform was laid by Union Cabinet Minister Shri Ram Vilas Paswan and Union Cabinet Minister Dr. Najma Heptulla on 17 February 2015 at Constitution Club, New Delhi. Miss Supriya Kanase and Mr. Basant Jha are the founders of the company. It is being run under the aegis of Quaint Media Consultant Private Limited which is an Indian Company registered under the Companies Act 2013.

Government ban
In 2007, the Indian government banned Live India for a month for breaching the Cable Networks Regulation Act of 1995, after the channel had run a doctored sting operation, broadcasting a false report about a porn racket being run by a school teacher. The report was ruled to be fake by a high court verdict.

References

External links
Official Website

Indian news websites
News media in India
Mass media in Uttar Pradesh